In English usage, a) refers to a piece of rural or agricultural land, typically with a cottage, farmhouse or estate building present, and often adjacent to a woodland or plantation.

Overview
Especially in tourism, the term has recently gained the colloquial meaning of a holiday home in a rural setting, situated on the Spanish mainland, the Balearics, and the Canary Islands, and throughout the countries of Spanish-speaking Latin America.

Fincas can typically look back on an extensive development history, and are often older than 300 years. In some regions, however, especially on the Balearics, new buildings are erected.

References

External links

Real estate in Spain 
Country estates